Cheshmeh Anjir may refer to:
 Cheshmeh Anjir, Sepidan, Fars Province
 Cheshmeh Anjir, Kohgiluyeh and Boyer-Ahmad
 Cheshmeh Anjir, Razavi Khorasan